Zaw Zaw Oo (born 31 July 1989) is a footballer from Burma. He is a defender for the Myanmar national football team and Myanmar U-23. He is the bronze medalist with  Myanmar U-23 in 2011 SEA Games.

He current plays for Ayeyawady United in Myanmar National League.

References

1989 births
Living people
Burmese footballers
Myanmar international footballers
Ayeyawady United F.C. players
Association football defenders
Southeast Asian Games bronze medalists for Myanmar
Southeast Asian Games medalists in football
Competitors at the 2011 Southeast Asian Games